Phase Zero  is an unreleased action-shooter video game that was in development by Hyper Image Productions and originally planned to be published by Atari Corporation on a scheduled September 1995 release date exclusively for the Atari Jaguar. It was the only game in development by Hyper Image.

Assuming the role of a newcomer pilot from the titular squadron assigned to fight against an rival organization only known as The Collective in a foreign planet, players take control of a windowless VTV hovertank craft called Hunter in order to complete a series of missions and tasks, while battling against enemy VTV hovertanks. Hyper Image  was originally working on a top-down shooter for the Super Nintendo Entertainment System, before the team later moved to the Jaguar with Phase Zero and opted to use their own interpretation of the heightmap technique to render the landscapes and visuals, in addition of also placing emphasis on LAN play for multiplayer.

Though the team at Hyper Image kept working on Phase Zero, despite not receiving anymore payment for its development in mid-1995, Atari Corp. ultimately halted and terminated the project in March 1996 along with other upcoming titles for the platform, a month before Atari merged with JT Storage in a reverse takeover on April of the same year. Although unreleased, a playable prototype has since been released and sold online by independent groups such as B&C Computervisions and later Songbird Productions.

Gameplay 

Phase Zero is a shooter video game with action and strategy elements that is primarily played in a first-person perspective, similar to AirCars and Hover Strike, where players assume the role of a rookie pilot from the titular squadron taking control of the VTV Hunter hovertank craft on a variety of missions across several levels, such as retrieval of a lost member from the same squadron or the elimination of enemy targets. Before the start of any level, players can browse through the main menu and check the different options available such as looking at the mission briefing to learn about the main objective to complete in the current mission.

Though the single-player missions can be played normally and some of the options in the main menu operate without issues, options such as the network mode crashes the game, while others like saving the game manually on the cartridge's EEPROM do not work in the unfinished release, in addition of the gameplay being prone to glitches and game-crashing bugs. The game also features support for the ProController.

Players are given full control of their craft in a three-dimensional environment during gameplay, with battles taking place in real-time and featuring destructible environments. Though players could freely roam in the game's levels to find new weapons and other items, the main objective or objectives of the missions have to be completed in order to progress further. Depending on the current mission, players are given a set number of weapons that can be chosen by pressing Option and right on the controller to attack enemy crafts but once the selected weapon is depleted, it becomes unavailable unless the player finds more ammo in the level. Pressing Option and up will bring the map screen, which shows both enemies and the location of the main objective within the current level, but since the action takes place in real-time, enemies can inflict damage to the player's craft. If the player's current Hunter unit is destroyed, they are immediately ejected and evacuated from the area, forcing to restart the mission.

Due to its unfinished nature, players are only able to reach the fifth mission that cannot be fully completed due to a missing objective element to progress further into the game, however, more levels can be accessed via cheat code.

History 
Phase Zero was first displayed to the public at Atari Corporation's booth during the Winter Consumer Electronics Show in 1995 under the name Hover Hunter, where both attendees and the video game press covering the event immediately compared the game with NovaLogic's Comanche and its Voxel Space engine due to the voxel-like graphics, and it only featured both an "Adventure" and "Combat" game modes to play for the audience, with the latter featuring support for up to eight consoles networked for multiplayer. In a January 1995 article featured on the student publication The Diamondback, it revealed that Hyper Image Productions was a game development company formed by seven former college students who took the path of entering into the video game industry. Paul Good, then-executive of Hyper Image stated that although they were not happy with the state of Hover Hunter when showcased at Winter CES 1995, it received positive reception from the public, while also looking for a publisher to buy the rights to the project. The article also revealed that the technique used to render the in-game visuals, dubbed "Displacement Texture Mapping", was written by both Jeremy Gordon (head of the company) and Otavio Good (brother of Paul Good), allowing them to create landscapes from pixels.

In two March 1995 online interviews by both Atari Explorer Online and Game Zero Magazine respectively with Hyper Image, the team spoke further about their beginnings, revealing that Andy Carlson was the composer for Hover Hunter and Jeremy divulged information in regards to the technique that he and Otavio were using to display the visuals of the game, which turned out to be their own interpretation of heightmap technique that was found in titles such as Cyberdreams' 1993 racing game CyberRace. Though the team remarked that Hover Hunter was Hyper Image's first full-fledged title for the Jaguar, they stated that a small networkable Pong game was their first project developed for the system. Jeremy also stated that the reason as to why they chose the Jaguar to develop their title was due to its powerful technical capabilities compared with other systems released at the time and the open support from Atari Corp. themselves. The game made its second and last trade show appearance at E3 1995, featuring a different set of playfields and HUD display compared to the last build seen at WCES 1995.

In a post-E3 1995 interview by Atari Explorer Online with the team at Hyper Image, they spoke more in regards to their beginnings as a game development company and the title in question, with both Jeremy and Paul stating that the team was originally working on an overhead shooter on the Super Nintendo Entertainment System but they later moved to the Jaguar and opted to use heightfield instead for their next project, with Jeremy comparing it to F-Zero but "with heights", while Paul explained further that each pixel on the landscape had its own elevation value to represent a specific height from a flat terrain. However, they later found out that the terrain would get heavily pixelated when being too close to it, but Otavio managed to implement interpolated heightfields to the technique that he and Jeremy created for the Jaguar to mitigate the issue. The team also placed importance to the LAN play for multiplayer, as members of the company were fans of networking titles. The game began to be advertised in magazines between mid-1995 and late 1995, while being slated for a Q2 1995 release, but it was later slated for a September/Q3 1995 release. Internal documents from Atari revealed that the game was renamed from Hover Hunter to Phase Zero in August 1995.

Although other internal documents from Atari still listed the project as in development on December of the same year, in addition of kept being advertised in magazines and showcased during the Fun 'n' Games Day event hosted by Atari, Hyper Image stopped receiving payment from Atari for the development of Phase Zero in the middle of 1995. In March 1996, a month before merging with JT Storage in a reverse takeover on April of the same year, Atari Corporation halted and cancelled all of their upcoming projects for the Jaguar platform, including Phase Zero. In the same year after it was cancelled, the trademark for its original name was abandoned, while the trademark renewals for the name of the development company were also cancelled in 2003 and 2004 respectively.

Release 
When Hasbro Interactive released the patents and rights to the Jaguar into public domain in 1999 by declaring it as an open platform and opening the doors for homebrew development, it permitted independent publisher and developers to release unfinished titles from the system's past life cycle as a result. A playable but incomplete build of Phase Zero was leaked online by former Atari Explorer Online editor Mark Santora on June 24, 2000, and this same version of the unfinished title would be later published by B&C Computervisions as a cartridge-only release on June 5, 2002 under the title Phase Zero Demo, to denote that it is not the finished product. Songbird Productions, an independent developer and publisher who specializes in unreleased titles for both the Jaguar and Atari Lynx, obtained permission from the original authors of the project to publish and sell the title under their label, with hopes of recovering the game's source code in order to complete it. In a 2018 forum post at AtariAge, former Hyper Image programmer Jamie Bible stated that a version of the game was also in development for the Sega Saturn, but it was cancelled as well.

Reception 
Prior to cancellation, then-Hyper Image executive Paul Good stated that Phase Zero received positive reception at WCES 1995 despite the team not being unhappy with the state of their game during the showcase at WCES 1995. French magazine CD Consoles commended its visuals. German publication Mega Fun noted its gameplay to be similar with Cybermorph. Then-head of Hyper Image Jeremy Gordon also noted the level of praise and feedback their project received after cancellation in the July 1996 issue of ST Format.

References

External links 
 
 Phase Zero at Atarimania
 Phase Zero at GameFAQs

1995 video games
Action video games
Atari games
Cancelled Atari Jaguar games
Cancelled Sega Saturn games
Multiplayer and single-player video games
Science fiction video games
Shooter video games
Songbird Productions games
Video games developed in the United States
Video games set in the future